Bram Peters (born 6 February 1992) is a Dutch sprinter and athletic coach.

Peters participated in the 4 x 400 m relay at the 2012 European Athletics Championships, where his team came in seventh. At the 2013 European Athletics U23 Championships, he came in fourth in the 400 m race, and participated in the 4 x 400 m relay, where his team came in seventh. In 2014, he won the 400 m race at the Dutch Indoor Athletics Championships. At the 2014 IAAF World Indoor Championships, he participated in the 400 m race, where he came in fourth in his heat.
Since age 25, he has worked as an athletics coach at National Sports Centre Papendal. He is from Heesch.

References

Living people
1992 births
Dutch male sprinters
Dutch athletics coaches
People from Bernheze
Sportspeople from North Brabant